The Abyss, also known as Woman Always Pays, is a 1910 Danish silent black-and-white drama film, written and directed by Urban Gad. The lead performance and natural acting by Asta Nielsen led to her international stardom. Because of the overt eroticism of Nielsen's performance, the film was censored in Norway and Sweden.

Plot
Knud, a vicar's son, meets Magda, a piano teacher, on a tram. He falls in love with her and introduces her to his parents. She refuses to go with them to the Sunday service and convinces him to go to the Circus with her. She dances with the performers and at night, one of them, Rudolf comes to seduce her. They run away on horseback. Magda is not happy with Rudolf who keeps flirting with other girls, but she cannot leave him, despite Knud's efforts.

Cast

Asta Nielsen as Magda Vang
Robert Dinesen as Knud Svane, Magda's fiancé
Poul Reumert as Rudolf Stern, circus performer
Hans Neergaard as Peder Svane, vicar
Hulda Didrichsen as the Vicar's wife
Emilie Sannom as Lilly d'Estrelle, singer
Oscar Stribolt as Waiter
Arne Weel as garden guest
Johannes Fønss as garden guest
Torben Meyer

References

External links
Afgrunden, at the Danish Film Institute

1910 films
1910 drama films
Danish drama films
Danish silent films
Films directed by Urban Gad
Danish black-and-white films
Silent drama films